Tremañes is a neighbourhood of the municipality of Gijón / Xixón, in Asturias, Spain. 
Previously to be integrated in Gijón, Roces was one of the historical parishes of the city.

Its population was 3,411 in 1994 and decreased to 2,369 in 2012.

An important industrial axis, the district included the Natahoyo area until the 20th century, (nowadays a coastal barrio of the city district). Due to its recent heavy industrialization, Tremañes itself tends to be considered part of the West area of the city district (numbered 7).

Neighbourhoods and places
La Braña
Nuevo Gijón / La Peral (between La Braña, Pumarín and Les Maravilles)
El Parrochu
La Peral
El Polígono
Los Campones
El Plano
Lloreda
Porreza
Les Maravilles
El Natahoyo
Moreda
La Picota
El Caravacu
La Muria
La Quintana
Pumarín
L'Alto Pumarín
Les Mil Quinientes
Perchera
Santolaya
La Torre
El Mortero
El Poblao de Santa Bárbara
La Xuvería
Les Cases de Pinón
El Pontón

References

External links
 Official Toponyms - Principality of Asturias website.
 Official Toponyms: Laws - BOPA Nº 229 - Martes, 3 de octubre de 2006 & DECRETO 105/2006, de 20 de septiembre, por el que se determinan los topónimos oficiales del concejo de Gijón.

Geography of Asturias
Parishes in Gijón